Mikhail Vasilyevich Shivlyakov (born 30 April 1980) is a former Russian Marine currently competing as a professional strongman.

Early life

Shivlyakov was born on April 30, 1980 in the city of Kiselyovsk, Kemerovo Region. In 1998-2000 he served in the Baltic Fleet, in the Black Sea Fleet, in the marines.

Strongman career
After the army, he began to engage in powerlifting.

Shivlyakov was invited to participate in the TV show "Army Shop". Moscow directors sought to cast Shivlyakov in the title role of the feature film "Bogatyr". Shivlyakov also starred in the comedy "Zomboyaschik". The creators of the Time of Heroes comic chose Shivlyakov as a prototype for one of the characters.

Mikhail achieved his first big success by winning the 2013 Arnold amateur competition which allowed him to compete in the professional 2014 Arnold Classic, in which he would place 7th.

In 2014, Shivlyakov first qualified for his first World's Strongest Man tournament, and the next year entered the finals of the 2015 tournament to finish 9th.

When he retires, he hopes to open his own Strongman training centre.

Personal records
Deadlift (Elephant Bar, with straps) -  - (2019 Arnold Strongman Classic)
Deadlift (Masters (40+) category) -  (World's Ultimate Strongman) (Feats of Strength series, 2020) (World Record)
Raw Deadlift -  (2018 WRPF World Championships, Moscow) 
Squat (single ply equipment) -  (2008 FPR Siberian Powerlifting Championships, Novorossiysk) 
Bench press (single ply equipment) –  (2008 FPR Siberian Powerlifting Championships, Krasnoyarsk Krai) 

Shivlyakov is a world record holder for towing an 18-ton tractor at a distance of 6.1 meters (Minsk).

In addition, Shivlyakov is the Russian record holder of:
Towing a 24-ton bus at 2.75 meters (Omsk);
Moving a 2-ton car by 25 meters with the help of teeth (Omsk);
Towing a truck weighing 14 tons at a distance of 15 m in 22 seconds (Omsk).

References 

1980 births
Living people
Russian strength athletes
Russian sportsmen
People from Kiselyovsk
Sportspeople from Kemerovo Oblast